The 2013 UCF Knights baseball team represented the University of Central Florida in the 2013 college baseball season. The Knights competed in Division I of the National Collegiate Athletic Association (NCAA) and Conference USA (C-USA). The team played their home games at Jay Bergman Field (also known as the UCF Baseball Complex), located on UCF's main campus in Orlando, Florida. The Knights were led by head coach Terry Rooney, who was in his fifth season with the team.

In the 2013 season, the Knights looked to build upon their appearance in the 2012 tournament, in which they came within one game of advancing to the programs first super regional. UCF had advanced to the NCAA tournament in each of the two previous seasons. The 2013 season also marked UCF's last as a member of Conference USA, as the Knights became members of the American Athletic Conference (The American) in July 2013.

Personnel

Coaching Staff

Roster

Schedule

! style="background:#000000;color:#BC9B6A;"| Regular Season
|- valign="top" 

|- bgcolor="#ccffcc"
| February 15 ||  || – || Jay Bergman Field || 7–1 ||B. Lively (1–0)||J. Brantley (0–1)|| None || 2,017 || 1–0 || –
|- align="center" bgcolor="#ffbbb"
| February 16 || Siena || – || Jay Bergman Field || 4–7 ||M. Gage (1–0)|| E. Skoglund (0–1)|| None || 1,381 || 1–1 || –
|- bgcolor="#ccffcc"
| February 17 || Siena || – || Jay Bergman Field || 8–2 || D. Davis (1–0)||R. Morales (0–1)|| None || 1,204 || 2–1 || –
|- align="center" bgcolor="#ffbbb"
| February 19 || #13 Florida || – || Jay Bergman Field || 3–5 ||P. Danciu (2–0)|| B. Adkins (0–1)||Magliozzi (2)|| 3,678 || 2–2 || –
|- bgcolor="#ccffcc"
| February 22 || Connecticut || – || Jay Bergman Field || 7–3 || B. Lively (2–0)||A. Marzi (0–2)||S. Davis (1)|| 1,702 || 3–2 || –
|- bgcolor="#ccffcc"
| February 23 || Texas Tech || – || Jay Bergman Field || 13–8||D. Davis (2–0)||C. Taylor (1–1)||C. Matulis (1) || 1,844 || 4–2 || –
|- align="center" bgcolor=""
| February 24 ||  || – || Jay Bergman Field || colspan=4 | Postponed
|- align="center" bgcolor="#ffbbb"
| February 26 ||  || – || Jay Bergman Field || 4–6 ||Clarkson (1–0)|| B. Adkins (0–2)||Leasure (1)|| 1,681 || 4–3 || –
|- align="center" bgcolor="#ffbbb"
| February 27 || at  || – || Jackie Robinson Ballpark || 0–6 ||M. Durapau (2–0)|| E. Skoglund (0–2)|| None || 412 || 4–4 || –
|-

|- bgcolor="#ccffcc"
| March 1 ||  || – || Jay Bergman Field  || 3–0 ||B. Lively (3–0)|| M. Pierpont (1–1)||S. Davis (2)|| 1,235 || 5–4 || –
|- bgcolor="#ccffcc"
| March 2 || Winthrop || – || Jay Bergman Field || 12–7 || C. Matulis (1–0)||T. Klitsch (0–2)|| None || 1,256 || 6–4 || –
|- bgcolor="#ccffcc"
| March 3 || Winthrop || – || Jay Bergman Field || 7–6 ||S. Davis (1–0)||J. Driver (0–2)|| None || 1,157 || 7–4 || –
|- align="center" bgcolor="#ffbbb"
| March 5 ||  || – || Jay Bergman Field || 5–9 ||M. Renner (2–0)||E. Skoglund (0–3)||C. Olmstead (2)|| 1,508 ||7–5|| –
|- align="center" bgcolor="#ffbbb"
| March 6 || at #24  || – || Mark Light Field at Alex Rodriguez Park || 0–5 || B. Radziewski (1–0)||B. Adkins (0–3) || None || 2,232 || 7–6 || –
|- align="center" bgcolor="#ffbbb"
| March 8 ||  || – || Jay Bergman Field || 0–4 || C. Anderson (2–1) || B. Lively (3–1) || None || 1,384  || 7–7 || –
|- bgcolor="#ccffcc"
| March 9 || Jacksonville || – || Jay Bergman Field || 5–2 || D. Davis (3–0) || J. Baker (0–3) || None || 1,188 || 8–7 || –
|- bgcolor="#ccffcc"
| March 10 || at Jacksonville || – || John Sessions Stadium || 6–4 || Z. Farve (1–0) || D. Woods (0–2) || None || 209 || 9–7 || –
|- bgcolor="#ccffcc"
| March 12 ||  || – || Jay Bergman Field || 6–4 || S. Davis (2–0) || C. Priestly (0–1) || None || 987 || 10–7 || –
|- bgcolor="#ccffcc"
| March 13 || Florida A&M || – || Jay Bergman Field || 5–2 ||Z. Favre (2–0) || B. Neal (0–1) || None || 1,206 || 11–7 || –
|- bgcolor="#ccffcc"
| March 15 || Columbia || – || Jay Bergman Field   || 10–3 || B. Lively (4–1) || D. Speer (0–2) || None || 1,553 || 12–7 || –
|- align="center" bgcolor="#ffbbb"
| March 16 || Columbia || – || Jay Bergman Field || 4–5 || T. Crispi (1–0) || S. Davis (2–1) || A. Black (2) || 1,230 || 12–8 || –
|- bgcolor="#ccffcc"
| March 17 || Columbia || – || Jay Bergman Field || 6–1 || B. Adkins (1–3) || A. Cline (0–2) || None || 1,385 || 13–8 || –
|- bgcolor="#ccffcc"
| March 18 || Columbia || – || Jay Bergman Field || 5–1 ||  E. Skoglund (1–3) || T.  Crispi (1–3) || None || 1,145 || 14–8 || –
|- align="center" bgcolor="#ffbbb"
| March 20 || at Jacksonville || – || John Sessions Stadium || 5–7 || W. Torrez (1–1) || D. Davis (3–1) || A. Maxon (2) || 122 || 14–9 || –
|- bgcolor="#ccffcc"
| March 22 || at * || – || Jerry D. Young Memorial Field || 8–0 || B. Lively (5–1) || S. Kelley (1–1) || None || 274 || 15–9 || 1–0
|- bgcolor="#ccffcc"
| March 23 || at UAB* || – || Jerry D. Young Memorial Field || 6–1 || C. Matulis (2–0) || T. Bryant (2–2) || None || 304 || 16–9 || 2–0
|- bgcolor="#ccffcc"
| March 24 || at UAB* || – || Jerry D. Young Memorial Field || 12–10 || S. Davis (3–1) || C. Rose (0–1) || T. Martin (1) || 314 || 17–9 || 3–0
|- align="center" bgcolor="#ffbbb"
| March 28 || * || – || Jay Bergman Field || 1–4 || J. Drehoff (1–3) || B. Lively (5–2) || J. Myrick (2) || 1,673 || 17–10 || 3–1
|- bgcolor="#ccffcc"
| March 29 || Southern Miss* || – || Jay Bergman Field || 4–3 || C. Matulis (3–0) || C. Livingston (0–4) || S. Davis (3) || 1,904 || 18–10 || 4–1
|- align="center" bgcolor="#ffbbb"
| March 30 || Southern Miss* || – || Jay Bergman Field || 3–4 || C. Fisk (2–1) || B. Adkins (1–4) || B. Rooney (3) || 1,633 || 18–11 || 4–2
|-

|- align="center" bgcolor="#ffbbb"
| April 2 || Florida || – || McKethan Stadium || 3-5 || R. Harris (4-2) || C. Matulis (3-1) || J. Magliozzi (6) || 3,225 || 18-12 || 4-2
|- align="center" bgcolor="#ffbbb"
| April 5 || at Memphis* || – || FedExPark || 1-2 || Moll (5-2) || B. Lively (5-3) || H. Hatfield(1) || 412 || 18-13 || 4-3
|- align="center" bgcolor="#ffbbb"
| April 6 || at Memphis* || – || FedExPark || 2-5 || Schoenrock (4-2) || C. Matulis (3-2) || Van Eaton(5) || 512 || 18-14 || 4-4
|- align="center" bgcolor="#ffbbb"
| April 7 || at Memphis* || – || FedExPark || 7-8 || H. Hatfield (2-1) || B. Adkins (1-5) || None || 472 || 18-15 || 4-5
|- align="center" bgcolor="#ffbbb"
| April 10 || at USF || – || USF Baseball Stadium || 3-9 || Herget (4-1) || D. Davis (3-2) || None || 1,202 || 18-16 || 4-5
|- bgcolor="#ccffcc"
| April 12 || at #18 Rice* || – || Reckling Park || 5-1 || C. Matulis (4-2) || A. Kubitza (4-2) || None || 3,868 || 19-16 || 5-5
|- bgcolor="#ccffcc"
| April 13 || at #18 Rice* || – || Reckling Park || 11-7 || D. Davis (4-2) || McCanna (2-1) || None || 3,387 || 20-16 || 6-5
|- align="center" bgcolor="#ffbbb"
| April 14 || at #18 Rice* || – || Reckling Park || 6-7 || Fox (4-0) || T. Martin (0-1) || None || 2,988 || 20-17 || 6-6
|- align="center" bgcolor="#ffbbb"
| April 16 || Florida Atlantic || – || Jay Bergman Field || 2-10 || Miller (3-0) || B. Adkins (1-6) || None || 1,447 || 20-18 || 6-6
|- align="center" bgcolor="#ffbbb"
| April 19 || Marshall* || – || Jay Bergman Field || 4-5 || Hopkins (2-2) || Z. Favre (2-1) || King(3) || 1,880 || 20-19 || 6-7
|- bgcolor="#ccffcc"
| April 20 || Marshall*|| – || Jay Bergman Field || 3-1 || B. Lively (6-3) ||  Blair (5-3) ||  S. Davis (4) || 1,153 || 21-19 || 7-7
|- bgcolor="#ccffcc"
| April 21 || Marshall* || – || Jay Bergman Field || 11-0 || B. Adkins (2-6) || Taylor (3-4) || None || 930 || 22-19 || 8-7
|- bgcolor="#ccffcc"
| April 26 || #30 Houston* || – || Jay Bergman Field  || 4-2 ||  C. Matulis (5-2) || Poncedeleon (5-4) || Z. Favre(3) || 1,423 || 23-19 || 9-7
|- bgcolor="#ccffcc"
| April 27 || #30 Houston* || – || Jay Bergman Field || 5-4 || S. Davis (4-1) || Pruitt (7-4) || None || 1,272 || 24-19 || 10-7
|- bgcolor="#ccffcc"
| April 28 || #30 Houston* || – || Jay Bergman Field || 7-1 || B. Adkins (3-6) || Garza (4-4) || Z. Favre(4) || 1,266 || 25-19 || 11-7
|-

|- bgcolor="#ccffcc"
| May 1 ||  Bethune-Cookman || 30 || Jay Bergman Field || 8–1 || T. Martin (1–1) || L. Martinez (0–2) || None || 1,045 || 26–19 || 11–7
|- align="center" bgcolor="#ffbbb"
| May 3 ||  at #9 Florida State || 30 || Mike Martin Field || 2–4 || R. Coles (3–1) || S. Davis (4–2) || None || 3,933 || 26–20 || 11–7
|- align="center" bgcolor="#ffbbb"
| May 4 ||  at #9 Florida State || 30 || Mike Martin Field || 1–6 || Leibrandt (7–4) || C. Matulis (5–3) || None || 4,215 || 26–21 || 11–7
|- align="center" bgcolor="#ffbbb"
| May 5 ||  at #9 Florida State || 30 || Mike Martin Field || 4–5 || R. Coles (4–1) || Z. Favre (2–2) || None || 4,268 || 26–22 || 11–7
|- bgcolor="#ccffcc"
| May 8 ||  Bethune-Cookman || – || Jay Bergman Field  || 4–0 || Z. Favre (3–2) || S. Garner (5–5) || None || 1,199 || 27–22 || 11–7
|- align="center" bgcolor="#ffbbb"
| May 10 ||  Tulane* || – || Jay Bergman Field || 1–8 || Byo (4–4) || B. Lively (6–4) || None || 1,279 || 27–23 || 11–8
|- align="center" bgcolor="#ffbbb"
| May 11 ||  Tulane* || – || Jay Bergman Field || 9–15 || McKenzie (3–2) || C. Matulis (5–4) || None || 1,163 || 27–24 || 11–9
|- bgcolor="#ccffcc"
| May 12 ||  Tulane* || – || Jay Bergman Field || 7–3 ||  B. Adkins (4–6) || R. LeBlanc (4–4) || None || 1,032 || 28–24 || 12–9
|- align="center" bgcolor="#ffbbb"
| May 14 ||  at Florida Atlantic || – || FAU Baseball Stadium || 3–4 || Logan (5–1) || E. Skoglund (1–4) || Adams (14) || 396 || 28–25 || 12–9
|- bgcolor="#ccffcc"
| May 16 ||  at East Carolina* || – || Clark–LeClair Stadium || 2–0 || B. Lively (7–4) || Hoffman (6–6) || None || 2,313 || 29–25 || 13–9
|- align="center" bgcolor="#ffbbb"
| May 17 ||  at East Carolina* || – || Clark–LeClair Stadium || 8–10 || Mabry (4–3) || D. Davis (4–3) || Reynolds (13) || 2,578 || 29–26 || 13–10
|- align="center" bgcolor="#ffbbb"
| May 18 ||  at East Carolina* || – || Clark–LeClair Stadium || 5–6 || J. Harris (3–3) || B. Adkins (4–7) || None || 2,418 || 29–27 || 13–11
|-

|-
! style="background:#000000;color:#BC9B6A;"| Post Season
|-

|- align="center" bgcolor="#ffbbb"
| May 22 || Memphis || – || Cougar Field || 1–6 || Moll (9–3) || B. Lively (7–5) || None || – || 0–1 
|- align="center" bgcolor="#ffbbb"
| May 23 || Rice || – || Cougar Field || 1–5 || Stephens (7–4) || C. Matulis (5–5) || None || 3,741 || 0–2
|- align="center" bgcolor="#ffbbb"
| May 24 || UAB || – || Cougar Field || 1–5 || A. Luna (2–4) ||  B. Adkins (4–8) || None || 3,250 || 0–3
|-

|-
| style="font-size:88%"| Rankings from USA TODAY/ESPN Top 25 coaches' baseball poll. Parenthesis indicate tournament seedings.
|-
| style="font-size:88%"| *Conference game

Rankings

See also
UCF Knights

References

UCF
UCF Knights baseball seasons